Mansergh may refer to:

Mansergh (surname)
Mansergh, Cumbria, England
Mansergh Snowfield, snow field of Antarctica
Mansergh Wall, cliff of Antarctica